Maria Florencia Manfredi (born 16 April 1982) is an Argentine equestrian athlete. She competed at the 2018 FEI World Equestrian Games and was the first rider who represent Argentina during a World Cup Final in Dressage. She competed also at the South American Games in Medellin 2010 and Quillota 2014, where she won team silver. In 2015 she competed at the 2015 Pan American Games.

References

1982 births
Living people
Argentine equestrians
Argentine dressage riders
Female equestrians
Equestrians at the 2015 Pan American Games
Pan American Games competitors for Argentina
21st-century Argentine women
Competitors at the 2014 South American Games
Competitors at the 2022 South American Games
South American Games medalists in equestrian
South American Games silver medalists for Argentina